(born December 27, 1973 in Saitama) is a retired male freestyle swimmer from Japan, who represented his native country at the 1992 Summer Olympics. His best result in three starts in Barcelona, Spain was the 8th place (3:43.25) in the Men's 4×100 metres Medley Relay event, alongside Hajime Itoi, Akira Hayashi and Keiichi Kawanaka.

References
 sports-reference

1973 births
Living people
Olympic swimmers of Japan
Swimmers at the 1992 Summer Olympics
Japanese male freestyle swimmers
20th-century Japanese people